Lysurus is a genus of fungi in the Phallaceae, a family known collectively as the stinkhorn fungi. The species have a widespread distribution, but are specially prevalent in tropical areas.

Description
The fruit bodies of Lysurus fungi are characterized by having short, thick arms which are upright, and may separate slightly in age. The inner surfaces of the arms are covered with a slimy spore mass called gleba, which typically has a fetid smell to attract insects to assist in spore dispersal. Viewed with a light microscope, Lysurus spores are narrowly ellipsoidal in shape, brownish in color, and have dimensions of 4–5 by 1.5–2 µm.

Species

References

External links

Phallales
Agaricomycetes genera
Taxa named by Elias Magnus Fries
Taxa described in 1823